Pryberezhne is an urban-type settlement in the Yenakiieve Municipality, Horlivka Raion, Donetsk Oblast (province) of eastern Ukraine. Population:

Demographics
Native language as of the Ukrainian Census of 2001:
 Ukrainian 48.21%
 Russian 50.00%
 Belarusian and Moldovan (Romanian) 0.61%

References

Urban-type settlements in Horlivka Raion